The United States participated in the 2010 Winter Olympics in Vancouver, British Columbia, Canada. The U.S. team had a historic Winter Games, winning an unprecedented 37 medals. Team USA's medal haul, which included nine gold, marked the first time since the 1932 Lake Placid Games that the U.S. earned more medals than any other participant.

The U.S. alpine ski team rebounded from a disappointing showing in 2006 by having its most successful Olympic performance ever, gathering a total of eight medals. Lindsey Vonn became the first American woman to win gold in the downhill event; while Bode Miller became the most successful U.S. alpine skier in history after winning gold in the super combined as well as two other medals. Medal winning performances by Julia Mancuso and Andrew Weibrecht contributed to the team's success.

In Nordic combined, the U.S. team ended an 86-year drought during which the United States had not earned a single medal in the sport. Bill Demong won gold in the individual large hill/10 km, and Johnny Spillane won silver in both the individual normal hill/10 km and the individual large hill/10 km. Demong, Spillane, Todd Lodwick and Brett Camerota also won silver in the team event.

Short track speed skater Apolo Ohno surpassed Bonnie Blair as the most decorated American Winter Olympic athlete in history with a total of eight medals in his Olympic career. Ohno gave the US relay team the final push for the bronze in the 5000 meter relay, and earned silver and bronze medals in the 1500 and 1000 meter individual events respectively. Women's 1000 meter silver medalist Katherine Reutter broke a streak dating back to 1994 in which no American woman had medaled in an individual short track event.

Long track speed skater Shani Davis became the first man to win back-to-back gold in the 1000 meter event. Davis also earned a silver medal at 1500 meters, duplicating his Olympic results from four years earlier.

Figure skater Evan Lysacek became the first American man to win the Olympic men's figure skating title since Brian Boitano in 1988 at Calgary.  Lysacek is also the first non-Russian or Unified Team skater to win the men's title since Boitano.  Ice dancers Meryl Davis and Charlie White won only the second silver medal in that discipline for the United States.

The U.S. snowboard team also enjoyed success, garnering five medals overall. Shaun White defended his gold medal in men's halfpipe, as did Seth Wescott in men's snowboard cross. Hannah Teter and Kelly Clark won silver and bronze in women's halfpipe.

The USA-1 four-man bobsled team, nicknamed "Night Train" and led by pilot Steve Holcomb, delivered the United States' first gold medal in the event since the St. Moritz Games in 1948. Holcomb's driving was described as "super-genius" by Kevin Kuske of the silver medal winning German team. Brakeman Curtis Tomasevicz and pushers Steve Mesler and Justin Olsen rounded out the gold medal crew.

The United States finished the 2010 Olympic Games by setting a new record for the most medals won by a single country at a Winter Olympics. The previous record of 36 was set by Germany at the 2002 Winter Olympics; with the silver medal won by the men's hockey team in the final Olympic event of 2010, the U.S. earned their 37th medal of the Vancouver Games. In addition, the U.S. team set a Winter Games record for bronze medals with 13, and the 15 silver medals by the U.S. was second only to the record of 16 set by Germany in 2002.

Medalists 

The following U.S. competitors won medals at the games. In the by discipline sections below, medalists' names are bolded.

| width="78%" align="left" valign="top" |

|style="text-align:left;width:22%;vertical-align:top"|

 Athletes who participated in the heats only.

Alpine skiing

The United States men's and women's teams were announced on January 26, 2010.

Men

Women

Biathlon

The United States pre-qualified three men and one woman for the 2010 Olympics based on their top-30 status in the overall World Cup standings. The remaining men's and women's teams were officially announced on January 11, 2010, after the conclusion of the IBU cup races at Altenberg, Germany.

Men

Women

Bobsleigh

The US has qualified three sleds in all three events.

Men

Women

Cross-country skiing

The United States men's and women's teams were announced on January 19, 2010. The United States had three automatic qualifiers. After the re-allocation of Olympic berths, the U.S. is expected to receive up to four additional spots.

Distance
Men

Women

Sprint
Men

Women

Curling

The United States has qualified a team in both the men's and women's tournaments.

Summary

Men's tournament 

Roster

Round-robon

Draw 1

Draw 2

Draw 3

Draw 4

Draw 6

Draw 7

Draw 9

Draw 10

Draw 11

Women's tournament 

Roster

Round-robin

Draw 1

Draw 2

Draw 4

Draw 5

Draw 7

Draw 8

Draw 9

Draw 11

Draw 12

Figure skating

The United States has qualified three entrants in men's singles, two in ladies' singles, two in pair skating, and three in ice dancing, for a total of 16 athletes.

Individual

Mixed

Freestyle skiing

The US Olympic freestyle team was announced on January 26, 2010.

Aerials
Men

Women

Moguls
Men

Women

Ski cross

Ice hockey 

Summary

Men's tournament 

Roster

Group play
United States were drawn into Group A.

All times are local (UTC-8).

The United States was seeded as the top team in the playoff round after finishing with nine points from three regulation wins during the group stage. They were drawn to face the winner of the Switzerland and Belarus qualification playoff, which was won by Switzerland in a shootout.

Quarterfinal

Semifinal

Gold medal game

Women's tournament 

Roster

Group play
The United States played in Group B.

All times are local (UTC-8).

Semifinal

Gold medal game

Luge

On December 16, 2009, the U.S. Olympic Luge team was announced. The team was formally announced in New York on December 18, 2009, on The Today Show. Honorary team captains were Eric Mabius of ABC's Ugly Betty television series and astronaut Scott Parazynski who were both lugers in the 1980s.

Men

Women

Nordic combined

The team was announced on January 21, 2010.

Short track speed skating

The men's and women's short track speed skating team was determined after the Olympic Trials, held September 9–13, 2009, in Marquette, Michigan. Combination of their overall ranking and individual event finishes is what was used to determine the Olympic team.

Men

Women

Skeleton

The U.S. Olympic skeleton team was finalized after the completion of the seventh World Cup race. Based on race rankings through January 17, 2010.

Ski jumping

The United States ski team announced the 2010 Olympic ski jumping team on January 20, 2010.

Snowboarding

The United States Olympic snowboard team was announced on January 26, 2010.

Freestyle
Men

Women

Parallel

Snowboard cross
Men

Women

Speed skating

The United States men's and women's speed skating team was announced on December 31, 2009.

Distance
Men

Women

Team pursuit

See also
United States at the 2010 Winter Paralympics
United States at the 2010 Summer Youth Olympics

References

External links 

 
 

2010 in American sports
Nations at the 2010 Winter Olympics
2010